The Fender Pro was an instrument amplifier manufactured by Fender Electric Instruments from 1946 to 1965. It was characterized by its dual 6L6-family power tubes and single 15" speaker, with output power increasing from 18 watts up to 40 watts over its production run. The Pro was replaced in the Fender lineup by its offspring the Pro Reverb.

History

Woody
The Professional was the largest of the three amplifiers Leo Fender produced at the launch of his company in 1946. It was built in small numbers on a special-order basis, and used the same circuitry and even the same chassis as the Model 26 (Deluxe), with "Model 26" on the control plate scratched out and 6L6 tubes and larger transformers driving a 15-inch field coil speaker. The distinctive rear-panel cabinet was uncovered hardwood (maple, mahogany or walnut), with red, gold or blue grill cloth and vertical chrome bars in the center.

Tweed
In 1948 the Pro-Amp was part of Fender's revamped lineup in top-panel cabinets covered in luggage twill (miscalled "tweed") with redesigned electronics. The first version (1948–53) had a small, round-cornered speaker aperture and is known as the "TV-front;" this was followed by the "wide-panel" (1953–55) and "narrow-panel" (1955–60) cabinets. The circuit over this time evolved considerably, from 6SC7 (or 6SL7) grid-leak biased preamp tubes and paraphrase inverter driving a cathode-biased 6L6G push-pull output section (model 5A5) to a more advanced 12AY7 cathode-biased preamp and 12AX7 cathodyne inverter driving fixed-bias 6L6GBs with negative feedback and filter choke (model 5E5-A); while headroom was increased and distortion reduced, output power remained around 25 watts.

Brownface

From 1960–63 the Pro along with Fender's other combo amps received a cabinet with front-mounted controls covered in brown Tolex; it shared its circuit with the other members of the "Professional Series", incorporating the architecture of the 5F6-A Bassman (long-tailed-pair phase inverter), separate bass, treble and volume controls on each channel and a complex "harmonic vibrato" tremolo circuit (6G5 and 6G5-A). The Pro, like many of the Professional Series, became solid-state rather than tube-rectified, eliminating rectifier sag; output was now pushed up to 40 watts through a pair of 5881s or 6L6GCs. The earliest brownface Pro Amps featured prototype aluminum knobs; these models primarily contain parts from 1959.

Blackface
In late 1963 the Fender amplifier line was reclothed in black Tolex with black-painted control panels. The Pro circuit (AA763) was largely the same as its predecessor, but reverted to tube rather than solid-state rectification and dropped the costly "harmonic vibrato" for a simpler electro-optic tremolo circuit. The Pro was joined in 1965 by the Pro Reverb, essentially the same amplifier with spring reverb and 2×12" speakers; the non-reverb Pro was discontinued the following year.

References

Instrument amplifiers